Ki Joko Bodo (17 February 1964 – 22 November 2022) was an Indonesian shaman and actor.

Ki Joko Bodo starred in several films. One of his most famous films is the 2007 Indonesian thriller ghost film, Terowongan Casablanca.

Ki Joko Bodo died at his house in Jakarta on 22 November 2022, at the age of 58.

Filmography

References

1964 births
2022 deaths
Indonesian actors